Ram Chandra Paswan (1 January 1962 – 21 July 2019) was elected four times to Lok Sabha : in 1999 and 2004 from Rosera (Lok Sabha constituency), and later in 2014 and 2019 from Samastipur constituency of Bihar. At the time of his death, he was a member of the Lok Janshakti Party political party. His son Prince Raj won the bye-poll occasioned by his death. He was the younger brother of Ram Vilas Paswan. 

He died after suffering cardiac arrest at Ram manohar lohia hospital Delhi on 21 July 2019.

External links
 Home Page on the Parliament of India's Website

|-

|-

1962 births
2019 deaths
People from Khagaria district
India MPs 2004–2009
Lok Janshakti Party politicians
Lok Sabha members from Bihar
Janata Dal politicians
Janata Dal (United) politicians
India MPs 1999–2004
India MPs 2014–2019
India MPs 2019–present